This is a list of seasons completed by the CSU Pueblo ThunderWolves football team''' of the National Collegiate Athletic Association.
The CSU Pueblo ThunderWolves fielded their first team in 1938 coached by Dale Rea. They stopped sponsoring football after the 1984 school year. They brought it back starting in the 2008 school year.

Division History

Seasons

References

CSU-Pueblo ThunderWolves

CSU Pueblo ThunderWolves football seasons